Newton is a village in the Bolsover district of Derbyshire, England, about a mile south of Tibshelf. Population details are included in the civil parish of Blackwell.

Other Newtons

Newton is the commonest placename in England, there being 87 in total.

In the same region are:
 Newton Solney, near Burton-on-Trent
 Newtown, Derbyshire, near New Mills
 Newton Grange, near Alsop en le Dale
 Newton, Greater Manchester, near Hyde
 Newton, Nottinghamshire, near East Bridgford
 Newton, Doncaster, in South Yorkshire.

Governance
Newton is one of the four villages (wards) that make up the civil parish of Blackwell – the other villages being Blackwell, Hilcote, and Westhouses.  The Parish Council has twelve members across the four wards and meets monthly.

The civil parish of Blackwell is part of the shire district of Bolsover.  The parish is represented by two councillors on Bolsover District Council.

The shire district of Bolsover is part of the shire county of Derbyshire.  The parish is represented by one councillor on Derbyshire County Council, although the electoral division covers South Normanton East and Tibshelf as well as Blackwell.

Blackwell civil parish forms part of the Bolsover parliamentary constituency. The MP currently (2010) is Dennis Skinner, who was elected MP in the 1970 general election. He has held the seat ever since.

History

Historical Timeline

Some of the main events in Newton's history are listed in the table below, in date order.  The final column provides the source of the information about each event.

Shops and Services over the years

The table below shows how the number of shops and services in Newton has varied over the years.  In the early 1900s, Newton was almost self-sufficient.  The number of shops in each category is shown in brackets.

Geography

Lie of the Land

Newton village centre (war memorial) is 160 metres above mean sea level, rising north-eastwards to 204 metres at the top of Newtonwood Lane (Whiteborough Hill) and dropping south-westwards to 144 metres at South Street.  Newton is drained by small watercourses on both the east and west sides. Both watercourses eventually reach the River Amber at Oakerthorpe.

Geology

Most of Newton lies on the Pennine Middle Coal Measures Formation bedrock. This is a mix of mudstone, siltstone, sandstone and coal seams.  The sandstone was used as a building material, especially during the pre-industrial era. The presence of coal accounts for the growth of the population in Newton during the industrial era.  The mudstone enabled many of the local collieries (including Blackwell) to manufacture their own bricks. To the east, Newton is overlooked by two Nottinghamshire hills, Whiteborough Hill and Strawberry Bank, that are capped by dolomitic limestone of the Cadeby Formation.

Nearby Places

Education
 Newton has a primary school on Hall Lane, providing education for children in the age range 4 to 11.
 As regards secondary education, Newton is in the catchment area of Tibshelf Community School, which caters for the 11 to 16 age range.

Places of Worship
The only church actually in Newton is the Methodist Church on Main Street. The nearest Anglican church is St Werburgh's at Old Blackwell. Of the original late 12th-century church, there remains but one pillar, in Transitional style, preserved on the inner face of the north wall. The tower dates from an 1828 rebuild, while the rest of the church is of 1878. In the porch is the stump of a Saxon cross.

Leisure facilities
For a village of its size, Newton is fairly well-served by leisure facilities.  These include:
 Children's playgrounds at Bamford Street, South Street and Town Lane.
 Sports field off Charnwood Crescent, including a multi-use games area.
 Allotments off Littlemoor Lane and South Street.
 Public houses:  George & Dragon and New Inn offering weekend entertainment on a regular basis.
 Group meetings at Community Centre, including Old Peoples Club and Women's Institute.
 Carnival events several times a year.
 Film showings at the Community Centre ("Cinema Newton") during the winter months.

Transport

Roads

Newton is on the B6026 road, which effectively provides a link between the villages south-east of Chesterfield and junction 28 of the M1.  The M1 passes immediately to the east of Newton, although there is no direct access to the motorway.  The Tibshelf motorway service area has two service entries (northbound and southbound) onto Newtonwood Lane.

Bus Services

As at February 2015, there are commercial bus services during the daytime on weekdays to Alfreton (2-per-hour), Chesterfield (hourly) and Mansfield (hourly).  There are evening and Sunday services to Alfreton and Mansfield but these run less frequently and are subsidised by Derbyshire County Council.

Train Services

The local stations for Newton were closed in 1930 (Tibshelf & Newton) and in 1963 (Tibshelf Town).  The nearest stations are now Alfreton, Chesterfield and Sutton Parkway.

Footpaths and Trails

Newton is linked to neighbouring villages by road-side pavements and public footpaths.  Newton is close to the junction of the Five Pits Trail with the Silverhill Trail, which provide longer-distance recreational routes.

People
Jedediah Strutt-  one of the key people in the Industrial Revolution, has links with Newton.  He was particularly involved in the development of mechanised clothing production, setting up mills in Belper and Milford that became the prototype for mills all over the world.
Although it is certain that he was born, lived and worked in the Newton area, there is some confusion over exact locations:
 Jedediah was born into a farming family in 1726 either in South Normanton or Newton.
 In 1754 Jedediah Strutt inherited his uncle's farm stock in Blackwell.
 Strutt's father (William) was a tenant of Newton Old Hall (on Cragg Lane). Jedediah is said to have worked on his revolutionary stocking frame at the hall.
 In 1754, Jedediah is said to have lived "where the old folk's bungalows are now in Main Street".
 Jedediah Strutt married Elizabeth Woollat 25 September 1755 at Blackwell.
 Jedediah died in 1797 and was buried in Belper.
Sophie Baggaley- Association football goalkeeper who plays for Birmingham City L.F.C. and has represented England up to under 20 level.

References

External links

 
  Parish Council Website

Villages in Derbyshire
Bolsover District